Tripp is a former town on the eastern side of Dallas County, Texas, United States.

After 1964, the town was annexed into Sunnyvale.

External links
  Handbook of Texas Online article
 

Sunnyvale, Texas